Cheltenham Spa St. James railway station was a station in the town of Cheltenham.

History

The first station was opened by the Cheltenham and Great Western Union Railway (C&GWU) on 23 October 1847, as Cheltenham. In the meantime, the C&GWU had been purchased by the GWR on 1 July 1843. Originally, the station was laid to the broad gauge, but this was converted to standard gauge in May 1872.

On 9 September 1894 it was replaced by another station also named Cheltenham, on a nearby site, slightly to the east, which had two curved semi-island platforms; two more were added later. An imposing brick-built station building was constructed with a covered carriage approach fronting St. James' Square, whilst a  goods shed was constructed to the north of the site in a yard capable of accommodating 475 wagons. In 1904 the station was able to handle goods, passengers, parcels, furniture vans, carriages, portable engines, machines on wheels, livestock, horse boxes, prize cattle vans and private carriages; there was a crane capable of lifting . The station was renamed twice, to Cheltenham St. James on 11 May 1908, and Cheltenham Spa St. James on 1 February 1925. It was from this station that the GWR inaugurated the Cheltenham Flyer on 9 July 1923 which ran to London via .

It was not until the British Railways period that these were eventually diverted to the former GWR stations at St. James and Malvern Road, this occurring from 3 November 1958, but less than three years later, on 9 September 1961, the services along the MSWJR line ceased entirely. Closure of the route from  followed on 15 October 1962. The remaining services using St. James were insufficient to make the station's retention a viable proposition and, as Birmingham to Gloucester services could not use it, Cheltenham Spa St. James station closed to passengers on 3 January 1966, with the remaining passenger services being diverted to the less-convenient Cheltenham Spa (Lansdown). General freight ceased at the same time, but coal continued until 31 October 1966; by this time the station was worked as a long siding from Malvern Road East Signal Box after the closure in June of that year of St. James's Box.

Route

Present day

A Waitrose supermarket now stands on the site of St. James station. A plaque has been affixed to the entrance of the store by Cheltenham Civic Society to commemorate the now-demolished terminus. Prior to the construction of the superstore, which opened in 2002, the trackbed was used as a cyclepath linking the town with Cheltenham Leisure Centre, and so when planning permission for the redevelopment of the station site was granted, a condition was imposed that the developer construct a new pedestrian bridge to ensure continued access to the remaining trackbed. The bridge follows a section of former railway embankment which was removed to provide road access to the new store. St James House also occupies part of the site.

Notes

References

 

Disused railway stations in Gloucestershire
Former Great Western Railway stations
Railway stations in Great Britain opened in 1847
Railway stations in Great Britain closed in 1894
Railway stations in Great Britain opened in 1894
Railway stations in Great Britain closed in 1966
Transport in Cheltenham
1847 establishments in England